Robert Julien Courtine (16 May 1910 – 14 April 1998) was a French food writer who also wrote under the pen names "La Reynière" and "Savarin".

Background
Courtine was a member of the far-right Action française during the 1930s, and was close to the anti-semitic journalist Henry Coston.  During the German Occupation, he was an active participant in the collaborationist newspapers La France au travail and L'Appel. He left Paris in August 1944 for the Sigmaringen enclave.  He was arrested in 1946 and sentenced to ten years at hard labor. The sentence was commuted in 1948, on condition that he not speak on the radio.

In 1952, Courtine joined Le Monde where, using the pen name "La Reynière" (inspired by Grimod de La Reynière), he wrote the gastronomy column until 1993.

Courtine has written many books on gastronomy.

Publications
 Drôle de macchabée, préface de Paul Reboux, A. Fleury, 1952
 L'assassin est à votre table, Éditions de la Pensée moderne, 1956 ; réédition, avec une préface d'Albert Simonin, la Table ronde, 1969
 Un gourmand à Paris, B. Grasset, 1959	
 Un nouveau savoir manger, B. Grasset, 1960
 Tous les cocktails (signé Savarin), Gérard et Cie,1960
 Les Dimanches de la cuisine, la Table ronde, 1962	
 La Cuisine du monde entier (signé Savarin), Gérard et Cie, 1963
 450 recettes originales à base de fruits, Éditions de la Pensée moderne, 1963	
 La Vraie cuisine française (signé Savarin), Gérard et Cie, 1963	
 Célébration de l'asperge, R. Morel, 1965
 Toutes les boissons et les recettes au vin, Larousse, 1968	
 La Gastronomie, Presses universitaires de France, 1970
 Le Guide de la cuisine française et internationale, Elvesier-Séquoia, 1972	
 Dictionnaire des fromages, Larousse, 1972	
 Le Cahier de recettes de madame Maigret (présenté par La Reynière), préface de Georges Simenon, Robert Laffont, 1974
 Balzac à table, Robert Laffont, 1976
 La Cuisine française : classique et nouvelle (signé La Reynière), dessins de Claudine Volckerick, Marabout, 1977	
 Mon bouquet de recettes, Marabout, 1977
 Zola à table, Robert Laffont, 1978
 Guide de la France gourmande, P. Bordas, 1980
 Toute la cuisine française et étrangère, Publimonde, 1982
 Dictionnaire de cuisine et de gastronomie (sous la dir. de R. J. Courtine), Larousse, 1986
 Les Fromages, Larousse, 1987	
 Le Guide de la cuisine des terroirs (cinq volumes), La Manufacture, 1992

Notes

Bibliography
 Pierre-André Taguieff, L'antisémitisme de plume 1940-1944, Berg éditeurs, 1999
 Henry Coston, Dictionnaire de la politique française, Publications Henry Coston, 2000

External links
 Le terroir perd La Reynière sur Libération.fr
 Notice d'autorité de la BnF

1910 births
1998 deaths
Food writers
French collaborators with Nazi Germany
People affiliated with Action Française
French male non-fiction writers
20th-century French journalists
20th-century French male writers